Milton Inniss, FRICS has been the High Commissioner of Barbados in London since October 2018.

Inniss was educated at the University of Reading. He worked in the construction industry for 34 years. In August 2018 the Government of Barbados identified him as a potential diplomat.

References 

Living people
High Commissioners of Barbados to the United Kingdom
Alumni of the University of Reading
Fellows of the Royal Institution of Chartered Surveyors
Year of birth missing (living people)